Susanna Kearsley (born January 17, 1966) is a New York Times best-selling Canadian novelist of historical fiction and mystery, as well as thrillers under the pen name Emma Cole. In 2014, she received Romance Writers of America's RITA Award for Best Paranormal Romance for The Firebird.

Biography

Kearsley studied politics and international development at university, and has worked as a museum curator. She lives near Toronto, Canada.

Bibliography

As Susanna Kearsley

 
 
 
 
 
 
 
  (part 1 of a trilogy, set in 1707)
 
  (part 2 of a trilogy)
 
 
 The Vanished Days (part 3 of a trilogy) 2021

As Emma Cole

Awards and reception

 2010 – Romantic Times Reviewers' Choice Award for Historical Fiction for The Winter Sea
 2011 – Romantic Times Reviewers' Choice Award for Historical Fantasy/Paranormal for The Rose Garden
 2011 – OKRWA National Readers Choice Award for Novel with Romantic Elements for The Rose Garden
 2013 – Goodreads Choice Nominee for Fantasy  for The Firebird
 2014 – Romance Writers of America RITA Award for Best Paranormal Romance for The Firebird
 2014 – DABWAHA Romance Tournament for Best Novel With Strong Romantic Elements for The Firebird

Her novel Mariana won the Catherine Cookson Literary Prize. Every Secret Thing was shortlisted for the Crime Writers of Canada's Arthur Ellis Award for Best Novel. Several titles have also been Top Picks at RT Book Reviews. Huffington Post called The Firebird a "stunning read."

Her 2015 release, A Desperate Fortune, debuted at #8 on the New York Times Bestsellers list in audio format. Other titles to make the New York Times best sellers list include The Rose Garden, The Winter Sea peaking at #5, The Shadowy Horses at #14.

References

External links
 Official Website
 Author's Blog
 Susanna Kearsley on USAToday

Living people
20th-century Canadian novelists
Canadian historical novelists
Canadian women novelists
21st-century Canadian novelists
20th-century Canadian women writers
21st-century Canadian women writers
RITA Award winners
Women historical novelists
Women romantic fiction writers
Writers from Brantford
1966 births